Joélcio "Janjão" Joerke, also known simply as "Janjão" (born 24 August 1972) is a Brazilian former professional basketball player. With the senior Brazilian national basketball team, Joerke competed at the 1994 FIBA World Cup, the 1996 Summer Olympics, and the 1998 FIBA World Cup.

References

External links
 

1972 births
Living people
Brazilian men's basketball players
Olympic basketball players of Brazil
Basketball players at the 1996 Summer Olympics
People from Campo Grande
1998 FIBA World Championship players
1994 FIBA World Championship players
Sportspeople from Mato Grosso do Sul